The 1917 Rock Island Independents season resulted in the team posting a 7–3 record.

Schedule

References

Rock Island Independents seasons
Rock Island
Rock Island